The 1973–74 New York Golden Blades/Jersey Knights season was the second season of operation of the franchise in the World Hockey Association.

The club was known as the New York Raiders in the previous season. With a change in ownership, the financially challenged team was renamed the New York Golden Blades for the start of this season. The team drew as few as 500 ticket buyers to some home games, and the latest (of 18) owners folded operations. The league took over operations and moved the team to the Greater Philadelphia metropolitan area township of Cherry Hill, New Jersey on November 21, 1973, renaming the franchise the Jersey Knights.

This was the last season of operation in the Northeast megalopolis area, as the franchise relocated to San Diego, California, becoming the San Diego Mariners for the 1974–75 WHA season.

Offseason

Regular season

Final standings

Game log

Player stats

Note: Pos = Position; GP = Games played; G = Goals; A = Assists; Pts = Points; +/- = plus/minus; PIM = Penalty minutes; PPG = Power-play goals; SHG = Short-handed goals; GWG = Game-winning goals
      MIN = Minutes played; W = Wins; L = Losses; T = Ties; GA = Goals-against; GAA = Goals-against average; SO = Shutouts;

Awards and records

Transactions

Jim McLeod traded to Los Angeles Sharks for Russ Gillow & Earl Heiskala, January, 1974. Earl Heiskala refused to report and was suspended.

Bobby Sheehan to Edmonton Oilers for future considerations (Bob Falkenburg), March, 1974.

Draft picks
New York's draft picks at the 1973 WHA Amateur Draft.

Farm teams

See also
1973–74 WHA season

References

External links

1973–74 in American ice hockey by team
1973–74 WHA season by team
1973-74